Wire in the Blood is a British crime drama television series, created and produced by Coastal Productions for Tyne Tees Television and broadcast on ITV from 14 November 2002 to 31 October 2008. The series is based on characters created by Val McDermid, including a university clinical psychologist, Dr Anthony "Tony" Valentine Hill (Robson Green), who is able to tap into his own dark side to get inside the heads of serial killers. Working with detectives, Hill takes on tough and seemingly impenetrable cases in an attempt to track down the killers before they strike again.

ITV cancelled the series in 2009, citing high production costs (which were estimated at up to £750,000 per episode) and the large number of new series being broadcast on the network.

Plot
The series is set in the fictional town of Bradfield, which is assumed to lie within West Yorkshire. It follows the Major Incident Team (MIT) of Bradfield Metropolitan Police's CID and the assistance provided to the detectives by clinical psychologist and serial offender profiler Dr. Tony Hill. All of the main episodes revolve around a serial killer whom Hill helps to track down by means of a profile, based on the killer's actions.

From Series 1 to 3, the MIT is headed by Detective Inspector (Chief Inspector from Series 2) Carol Jordan. The two develop a close relationship, which is further explored in McDermid's novels, in which Jordan is always head of the MIT. In the first episode of Series 4, Jordan is replaced—without real explanation—by Detective Inspector Alex Fielding, who (despite being initially hesitant to accept Tony's support) eventually develops an equally close relationship.

A constant theme is Carol's, and later Alex's, struggle with their senior officers, who are often less trusting of Tony's eccentric methods and far-fetched theories than Carol and Alex. There is also a romantic storyline showing a growing development in Tony's relationships with both Carol and later Alex. Whilst starting as friendships, both detectives begin to develop romantic feelings for Tony, although these feelings never develop into a relationship.

Cast
 Robson Green as Dr. Anthony "Tony" Hill
 Hermione Norris as DCI Carol Jordan (Series 1–3)
 Simone Lahbib as DI Alex Fielding (Series 4–6)
 Mark Letheren as DS Kevin Geoffries (Series 1–6)
 Emma Handy as DC Paula McIntyre (Series 2–6)
 Tom Chadbon as ACC John Brandon (Series 1–2)
 Peter Sullivan as ACC Paul Eden (Series 3–4)
 Alan Stocks as DS Don Merrick (Series 1–2)
 Doreene Blackstock as DS Annie Reiss (Series 1)
 Elaine Claxton as Maggie Thomas (Series 1)
 Mark Penfold as Dr. Ashley Vernon (Series 1–5)
 Michael Smiley as Dr. Liam Kerwin (Series 6)
 Jethro Skinner as Tim Eccles (Series 3–5)
 Barry King as PC.Barry (Series 1-4)(Billy Elliot)

Characters
 Dr. Tony Hill (Robson Green) is a clinical psychologist whose expertise with damaged minds has proved invaluable to the police. Intelligent and endearing, if somewhat eccentric, he is driven by a tangible sense of right and wrong and his understanding of human behaviour enables him to empathize strongly with both victim and killer. Tony formed a close bond with Carol Jordan, between them putting many serial killers behind bars. As such, he was devastated to learn that she had left Bradfield to work in South Africa. Despite his often bizarre behaviour, Tony's ability to get results when evidence is scarce has won him the support of Jordan's successor, Alex Fielding, who eventually trusts him as part of her team. But Tony's involvement with the police often affects him deeply as he finds it difficult to distance himself from disturbing cases. The plastic "blue bag" that Tony is often seen with was gleaned from Green's research for the series, which involved spending time with criminal psychologist Julian Boon. Green described Boon in part as an "extraordinary, intelligent, nice guy who carried his life in a blue bag and traveled on a double-decker bus. No one looked at him twice."
 D.C.I. Carol Jordan (Hermione Norris) (Series 1–3) is a hardworking officer who forms a close relationship with Tony, successfully working with him to secure the arrest of several killers. In series two's "Right to Silence", Carol is promoted from Detective Inspector to Detective Chief Inspector. Although the two soon grow close, they never achieve the romantic relationship that Carol desires with Tony and in the end, Carol leaves Bradfield to take a position in South Africa. Speaking of Norris's portrayal of Carol Jordan, Val McDermid said that she "brings real intelligence and insight to her role, demonstrating that there's a lot more to her skills than we got to see in Cold Feet."
 D.I. Alex Fielding (Simone Lahbib) (Series 4–6) is a senior detective and a dedicated professional, always willing to put in the hours to get the case solved. Her warmth and down-to-earth style have gained her the respect of her police colleagues and Tony. She has learned to trust that Tony's intuition can sometimes mean the key to cracking a case when physical evidence is hard to come by. But the pressure of working on murder investigations sometimes causes a strain at home where she is a single mum to young Ben. When the stresses of life take their toll, she finds it difficult to ask for help.
 D.S. Kevin Geoffries (Mark Letheren) has proved himself a worthy member of the team, despite a few indiscretions and lapses in judgement. After a rocky start he comes to respect Tony, believing he can offer an extra dimension to the investigations. Kevin works closely with Paula McIntyre, and their professional bond has made them good friends. 
 D.C. Paula McIntyre (Emma Handy) is a lively and feisty young detective. She is not fazed easily and is keen to take on more responsibility and pleased to have strong role models in Carol and later, Alex. She also has a deep respect for Tony after he saved her life while on the job.
 A.C.C. John Brandon (Tom Chadbon) (Series 1–2) is an excellent and experienced senior officer, but one who is shown to be more concerned with ends rather than means. Brandon is shown to expect quick results from the team and from Carol in particular, though he tries to back her as much as he can. In "Sharp Compassion", Brandon suffers a heart attack and nearly becomes a victim of a serial killer. Although his character continues to appear in the novels, Brandon only appeared in the first two series. A.C.C. Paul Eden replaces Brandon from series three onwards. Eden is college-educated, fast-tracked and confident. Focused, tailored and practical, he demands tangible results and is wary of Tony's more cerebral methods. He secretly hopes Alex will not become as close to Tony as Carol did.
 D.S. Don Merrick (Alan Stocks) (1–2) is a persistent and perseverant officer. While generally conscientious, his temper occasionally gets the better of him, leading to impulsive behaviour. At the end of the second series, Merrick assaults Kevin Geoffries after he compromises one of his closest informants. It is assumed that this leads to his demotion or relocation; he does not appear in any later episodes.
 D.S. Annie Reiss (Doreene Blackstock) (Series 1) is an Afro-British detective who is part of Jordan's team. Reiss only appears in the first series, after which she is replaced by Paula McIntyre (Emma Handy) (Series 2–6).
 Dr. Ashley Vernon (Mark Penfold) (Series 1–5) is the police medical examiner.
 Dr. Liam Kerwin (Michael Smiley) (Series 6) replaces Ashley Vernon in the sixth and final series.
 Tim Eccles (Jethro Skinner) (Series 3–5) is the police's resident IT expert.

Episodes
Only the first two episodes of the first series, "The Mermaids Singing" and "Shadows Rising", the second episode of series four, "Torment", and the second episode of series six, "Falls the Shadow", are based on McDermid's books; the rest are original plots written by others.

Series overview

Series 1 (2002)
Filming took place from 22 October 2001 to 14 February 2002 in various locations around Newcastle upon Tyne, Durham and Northumberland, including Bollyhope Quarry (Durham), Chopwell Woods (Gateshead) and Eshott Hall (Northumberland) which was used for the Vance residence.

Series 2 (2004)
The series was filmed in locations in and around Newcastle including the main location of the old Bank of England building in Pilgrim Street, Newcastle. Also used: Finchale Priory, Durham Cathedral, Calder's Brewery near the Newcastle Arena plus various temporary (daily) locations. Every episode of series two was the leader in its time slot.

Series 3 (2005)

Series 4 (2006)
Hermione Norris does not return as D.C.I. Carol Jordan, having accepted the role of Ros Myers in Spooks. Simone Lahbib joins the cast as her replacement, D.I. Alex Fielding. Jordan is explained as having emigrated to South Africa.

Series 5 (2007)
Filming for this series took place between January 15 and April 20, 2007. Prayer of the Bone was filmed in and around Austin and La Grange, Texas.

Series 6 (2008)
Series six began filming in early 2008 and wrapped on 30 March.

International airings

The series has appeared in the United States on the cable channel BBC America, in Australia on the public channel ABC, and in New Zealand on TV 1. As of May 2014, the show is screening on British televisions on the channel ITV3.  The show is currently available on the Hulu Streaming service in the U.S. It began running on Acorn TV in 2018. The show is also now available on the streaming service BritBox.

Home releases
Region 2 is distributed by Revelation Films, Region 1 by Koch Vision and Region 4 by Magna. In 2019, Via Vision Entertainment obtained the rights to the series in Australia, Region 4.

Awards and nominations

See also 

 Karen Pirie

References

External links
 

Wire in the Blood at Coastal Productions
Wire in the Blood at BBCAmerica.com

2002 British television series debuts
2008 British television series endings
2000s British drama television series
2000s British crime television series
ITV television dramas
Television shows produced by Tyne Tees Television
Television shows based on British novels
English-language television shows
Television shows set in Newcastle upon Tyne
British crime drama television series